Elisa Villanueva Beard is the CEO of Teach For America (TFA), a nonprofit organization dedicated to improving educational outcomes for low-income students across America. Villanueva Beard began her education career as a 1998 corps member of TFA, teaching first and second grade bilingual education.

Background
Villanueva Beard grew up in the Rio Grande Valley in McAllen, Texas. She received her Bachelor of Arts degree in sociology from DePauw University in 1998, where she was also a member of the college's NCAA Division III basketball team. Villanueva Beard remembers being part of a small minority of Mexican American students at DePauw, as well as struggling academically when she first started college, despite graduating at the top of her high school class.

Teach For America
Villanueva Beard served as a corps member with TFA after graduating college, teaching first and second grade bilingual education in Phoenix, Arizona. After three years in the classroom, she became the leader of the organization's Rio Grande Valley region. Four years later, in 2005, Villanueva Beard became TFA's Chief Operating Officer. As COO, Villanueva Beard helped grow the organization's field operations from 22 to 46 regions.

In 2013, Wendy Kopp transitioned out of the role of CEO of TFA and passed the leadership onto co-CEOs Villanueva Beard and Matthew Kramer. In September 2015, Kramer stepped down from his position, and Villanueva Beard became the sole CEO of the organization.

References

External links
 Teach For America Leadership Team - Teach For America
 Official Biography - Teach For America

Living people
American nonprofit executives
Women nonprofit executives
People from McAllen, Texas
People from Houston
Teach For America alumni
Educators from Texas
American women educators
Year of birth missing (living people)
21st-century American women